Emilio Tomás González is a Partner and Senior Advisor to the Executive Committee at Ducenta Squared Asset Management, a minority-owned and operated fixed income firm. Ducenta Squared offers traditional asset management capabilities with forward-looking investment solutions.

Prior to this, he served as City Manager and Chief Administrative Officer of the City of Miami. He was appointed by Mayor Francis X. Suarez in December 2017 and ratified by the Miami City Commission in January 2018. He served in that position until February 2020.

He previously served as Aviation Director and CEO of Miami International Airport and the Miami Dade County Aviation Department from April 2013 to December 2017.

Dr. Gonzalez has held private sector executive positions and served as Director of the US Citizenship and Immigration Services. (USCIS), an Under Secretary position within the Department of Homeland Security. Appointed by President Bush and confirmed by the United States Senate in December 2005, he led an organization of more than 17,000 federal and contract employees responsible for the accurate, efficient and secure processing of immigration benefits. Gonzalez announced his resignation on March 13, 2008, and it became effective on April 18.

He also served as Director of Western Hemisphere Affairs at the National Security Council.  In this capacity he served as a key national security and foreign policy advisor to President George W. Bush and Dr. Condoleezza Rice.

Dr. Gonzalez has served as CEO of Indra USA, the US subsidiary of Indra Sistemas, Spain's largest IT provider as well as running his own consulting company.

Background 

Gonzalez was born in Havana, Cuba and raised in Tampa, Florida.  He joined the Miami-based international law firm of Tew Cardenas as Senior Managing Director for Global and Government Affairs after leaving government service.

An international affairs specialist, Gonzalez has spent most of his professional career involved in foreign affairs and international security policy. He has served in or traveled to almost every country in the Western Hemisphere on numerous occasions, and has represented the United States government on special diplomatic missions. He remains active in international politics, and often meets with heads of state, foreign ministers, trade ministers, ambassadors, and political leaders. He is a noted commentator on Hispanic, business, immigration and international affairs, and regularly appears on local, national, and international radio and television programs.

Gonzalez completed a distinguished career in the United States Army that spanned twenty-six years. He served with the Defense Intelligence Agency as a military attaché to U.S. Embassies in El Salvador and Mexico, taught at the United States Military Academy at West Point, and headed the Office of Special Assistants for the Commander-in-Chief of the United States Southern Command. During his military career he earned numerous US military decorations as well as the Parachutist Badge and the Presidential Staff Badge. Gonzalez has also been decorated by the Governments of Spain, Mexico, Guatemala, Honduras, El Salvador, Nicaragua, Panama, the Dominican Republic and Colombia. He retired from active duty with the rank of Colonel.

A graduate of the University of South Florida in Tampa with a B.A. in International Studies, Gonzalez also earned M.A. degrees in Latin American Studies from Tulane University, and in Strategic Studies and National Security Affairs from the US Naval War College. He was awarded a Ph.D. in International Relations from the Graduate School of International Studies, University of Miami, where he also received the Graduate School Award for Academic Achievement.

Recognition 
Dr. Gonzalez was recognized as "One of the Most Influential Latinos in the Country" by Poder Magazine, People Magazine en Espanol, Latino Leaders, Hispanic Magazine, and Hispanic Business Magazine.  He was recognized as the Distinguished Alumnus 2010 by the University of South Florida and has received Honorary Degrees from Miami Dade College and Florida Memorial University. 

In 2018 he earned the Lloyd D. Gladfelter Award for Government Innovation awarded jointly by the University of Wisconsin and the University of South Florida.  He has also earned numerous civic and business awards and recognitions. Dr. Gonzalez is a member of the Council on Foreign Relations and the Advisory Board of the National Medal of Honor Museum Foundation.

Dr. Gonzalez is a Knight of Malta and a Knight of the Sacred Constantinian Order of St. George.  In 2010, he was inducted into the College of Nobles of the Principality of Asturias (Spain).

References

American politicians of Cuban descent
George W. Bush administration personnel
Knights of Malta
Naval War College alumni
Living people
United States Army colonels
United States Department of Homeland Security officials
University of South Florida alumni
1956 births